Sokratis Kyrillidis (born 15 June 1998) is a Greek professional footballer who plays as a defensive midfielder for Football League club Ialysos.

References

1998 births
Living people
Greek footballers
Super League Greece players
Football League (Greece) players
Gamma Ethniki players
PAOK FC players
Aiginiakos F.C. players
Pierikos F.C. players
GAS Ialysos 1948 F.C. players
Association football midfielders
Footballers from Kozani